How Life Imitates Chess is a book by former World Chess Champion Garry Kasparov.

Kasparov uses his experience in playing chess successfully as an analogy for how to be successful in real life. He recounts many events from his chess career.

Reception
The book has received mixed reviews from The Guardian and New Humanist., and a positive review by Blas Moros.

References

Chess books
Chess in Russia
2007 books
Russian memoirs
2007 in Russian sport
Garry Kasparov